Pizona is an unincorporated community in Mono County, California.

References

Unincorporated communities in California
Unincorporated communities in Mono County, California